Anderson da Silva (born 25 January 1991 in João Pessoa), commonly known as Anderson Paraíba, is a Brazilian footballer. He currently plays for Saudi club Jerash.

Honours

Boa Esporte
Campeonato Brasileiro Série C: 2016

Operário Ferroviário
Campeonato Catarinense Second Division: 2018
Campeonato Brasileiro Série C: 2018

Manaus
Campeonato Amazonense: 2021

References

External links
 Anderson Paraíba at playmakerstats.com (English version of ogol.com.br)
 

1991 births
Living people
Brazilian footballers
Sport Club do Recife players
Campinense Clube players
Centro Sportivo Paraibano players
Salgueiro Atlético Clube players
ABC Futebol Clube players
Centro Sportivo Alagoano players
Esporte Clube Novo Hamburgo players
Boa Esporte Clube players
AEL Kalloni F.C. players
Esporte Clube Passo Fundo players
Operário Ferroviário Esporte Clube players
Esporte Clube São Luiz players
Concórdia Atlético Clube players
América Futebol Clube (RN) players
Manaus Futebol Clube players
Botafogo Futebol Clube (PB) players
Clube do Remo players
Jerash FC players
Saudi Second Division players
Association football midfielders
Expatriate footballers in Saudi Arabia
Brazilian expatriate sportspeople in Saudi Arabia